The 14th Grey Cup was played on December 4, 1926, before 8,276 fans at the Varsity Stadium at Toronto.

The Ottawa Senators defeated the Toronto Varsity Blues 10–7.

Joe Miller was the star of the game, scoring three vital late games "rouges" (single points) and staving off two critical potential turnovers.

References

External links
 
 

Grey Cup
Grey Cup, 14th
Grey Cup
1926 in Ontario
December 1926 sports events
1920s in Toronto
Ottawa Rough Riders